Yvette Cooper (born 20 March 1969) is a British politician serving as Shadow Home Secretary since 2021, and previously from 2011 to 2015. She served in Gordon Brown's Cabinet as Chief Secretary to the Treasury from 2008 to 2009 and Work and Pensions Secretary from 2009 to 2010. A member of the Labour Party, she has been Member of Parliament (MP) for Normanton, Pontefract and Castleford, previously Pontefract and Castleford, since 1997.

One of 101 female Labour MPs elected at the 1997 general election, Cooper was a Parliamentary Under-Secretary of State at three departments under Prime Minister Tony Blair from 1999 to 2005. She was promoted to Minister of State for Housing and Planning in 2005, and was retained in the role when Gordon Brown became Prime Minister in 2007. In 2008, she was appointed to Brown's Cabinet as Chief Secretary to the Treasury, before being promoted to Secretary of State for Work and Pensions in 2009. After Labour lost the 2010 general election, Cooper served in Ed Miliband's Shadow Cabinet as Shadow Foreign Secretary from 2010 to 2011. In 2011, her husband Ed Balls was promoted to Shadow Chancellor of the Exchequer; Cooper replaced Balls as Shadow Home Secretary and served until Labour lost the 2015 general election.

On 13 May 2015, Cooper announced she would run to be Leader of the Labour Party in the leadership election following the resignation of Miliband. Cooper came third with 17.0% of the vote in the first round, losing to Jeremy Corbyn. Cooper subsequently resigned as Shadow Home Secretary in September 2015. Cooper was the chair of the Home Affairs Select Committee from 2016 to 2021. As a backbencher, Cooper repeatedly sought to extend Article 50 to delay Brexit. She became Shadow Home Secretary again in Keir Starmer’s November 2021 reshuffle.

Early life and education
Cooper was born on 20 March 1969 in Inverness, Scotland. Her father is Tony Cooper, former General Secretary of the Prospect trade union, a former non-executive director of the Nuclear Decommissioning Authority and a former Chairman of the British Nuclear Industry Forum. He was also a government adviser on the Energy Advisory Panel. Her mother, June, was a maths teacher.

She was educated at Eggar's School, a comprehensive school in Holybourne, and Alton College, both in Alton, Hampshire. She read Philosophy, politics and economics at Balliol College, Oxford, and graduated with a first-class honours degree. She won a Kennedy Scholarship in 1991 to study at Harvard University, and she completed her postgraduate studies with an MSc in Economics at the London School of Economics.

Early career
Cooper began her career as an economic policy researcher for Shadow Chancellor John Smith in 1990 before working in Arkansas for Bill Clinton, nominee of the Democratic Party for President of the United States, in 1992. Later that year, she became a policy advisor to then Shadow Chief Secretary to the Treasury, Harriet Harman.

At the age of 24, Cooper developed chronic fatigue syndrome, which took her a year to recover from. In 1994 she moved to become a research associate at the Centre for Economic Performance. In 1995, she became the chief economics correspondent of The Independent, remaining with the newspaper until her election to the House of Commons in 1997.

Member of Parliament
Cooper was selected to contest the safe Labour seat of Pontefract and Castleford at the 1997 general election, after Deputy Speaker Geoffrey Lofthouse announced his retirement. She retained the seat for Labour with a majority of 25,725 votes, and made her maiden speech in the Commons on 2 July 1997, speaking about her constituency's struggle with unemployment. She served for two years on the Education and Employment Select Committee.

Blair and Brown government: 1999–2010
In 1999, she was promoted as Parliamentary Under-Secretary of State at the Department of Health. As a health minister, Cooper helped implement the Sure Start programme. In this post, she was also the first British government minister in history to take maternity leave. From 2002 to 2003, Cooper was the Parliamentary Secretary to the Lord Chancellor's Department.

In 2003, she became Parliamentary Under-Secretary for Regeneration in the Office of the Deputy Prime Minister with the responsibility of coalfield regeneration. Following the 2005 general election she was promoted to Minister, as Minister of State for Housing and Planning based in the Department for Communities and Local Government from 2006.

After Gordon Brown became Prime Minister, Cooper was invited to attend cabinet meetings as Housing Minister. Shortly after taking the job, she was required to introduce the HIPS scheme. According to Conservative columnist Matthew Parris, Cooper conceived HIPS but avoided direct criticism for its problems because of her connection with Brown.

The Labour government under Brown had identified affordable housing as one of its core objectives. In July 2007, Cooper announced in the House of Commons that "unless we act now, by 2026 first-time buyers will find average house prices are ten times their salary. That could lead to real social inequality and injustice. Every part of the country needs more affordable homes – in the North and the South, in urban and rural communities".

In 2008, Cooper became the first woman to serve as Chief Secretary to the Treasury where she was involved with taking Northern Rock into public ownership. As her husband, Ed Balls, was already a cabinet minister, her promotion meant that the two became the first married couple ever to sit in the cabinet together.

In 2009, Cooper was appointed as Secretary of State for Work and Pensions and took over leading on the Welfare Reform Act 2009 which included measures to extend the use of benefit sanctions to force unemployed people to seek work. Many campaigners – including the Child Poverty Action Group (CPAG) – urged Cooper to rethink Labour's approach, arguing instead that increasing support for job seekers was vital to eradicating child poverty.

Allegations over expenses

In May 2009, the Daily Telegraph reported that Cooper had changed the designation of her second home twice in two years. Following a referral to the parliamentary standards watchdog, Cooper and her husband Ed Balls were exonerated by John Lyon, the Standards Commissioner. He said they had paid capital gains tax on their homes and were not motivated by profit. Cooper and Balls bought a four-bedroom house in Stoke Newington, North London, and registered this as their second home (rather than their home in Castleford, West Yorkshire); this qualified them for up to £44,000 a year to subsidise a reported £438,000 mortgage under the Commons Additional Costs Allowance, of which they claimed £24,400. An investigation in MPs' expenses by Sir Thomas Legg found that Cooper and her husband had both received overpayments of £1,363 in relation to their mortgage. He ordered them to repay the money.

Miliband Shadow Cabinet: 2010–2015

After Labour were defeated at the 2010 general election, Cooper and her husband Ed Balls were both mentioned in the press as a potential leadership candidates when Gordon Brown resigned as Leader of the Labour Party.

Before Balls announced his candidacy, he offered to stand aside if Cooper wanted to stand, but Cooper declined for the sake of their children, stating that it would not be the right time for her. She later topped the 2010 ballot for places in the Shadow cabinet, and there was speculation that the newly elected Labour Leader Ed Miliband would appoint her Shadow Chancellor of the Exchequer. She instead became Shadow Foreign Secretary.

When Alan Johnson resigned as Shadow Chancellor on 20 January 2011, Cooper was appointed Shadow Home Secretary. Her husband, Ed Balls, replaced Johnson as Shadow Chancellor. Cooper also served as Shadow Minister for Women and Equalities from October 2010 to October 2013.

Shadow Home Secretary: 2011–2015
On 20 January 2011, she took the position of Shadow Home Secretary amidst a shadow cabinet reshuffle. In this position, Cooper shadowed Theresa May at the Home Office. She labelled the government's vans displaying posters urging illegal immigrants to go home a "divisive gimmick" in October 2013.

In February 2013, she was assessed as one of the 100 most powerful women in the United Kingdom by Woman's Hour on BBC Radio 4, although not in the top 20.

In 2013, she proposed the appointment of a national commissioner for domestic and sexual violence. She spoke at the Labour Party Conference in 2014 about eastern Europeans who were mistreated by employers of migrant labour.

Cooper was strongly critical of the cuts to child tax credit announced by George Osborne in the July 2015 Budget; she authored the following statement in the New Statesman:

2015 Labour leadership election

In 2015, she was nominated as one of four candidates for the Labour leadership following the party's defeat at the 2015 general election and the resignation of Ed Miliband. Cooper was nominated by 59 MPs, 12 MEPs, 109 CLPs, two affiliated trade unions and one socialist society. The Guardian newspaper endorsed Cooper as the "best placed" to offer a strong vision and unite the party while the New Statesman's endorsement praised her experience. Former Prime Minister Gordon Brown publicly endorsed Cooper as his first choice for leader, as did former Home Secretary Alan Johnson.

During the campaign, Cooper supported reintroducing the 50p income tax rate and creating more high-skilled manufacturing jobs. She proposed the introduction of a living wage for social care workers and the construction of 300,000 houses every year. Cooper disagreed that Labour spent too much whilst in government.

Backbencher: 2015–2021
Following the 2015 Labour Party leadership election, Cooper returned to the back benches, after nearly 17 years on the front bench. Building on her existing work on the European refugee crisis, Cooper was appointed chair of Labour's refugee taskforce, working with local authorities, community groups and trade unions to develop a sustainable and humanitarian response to the crisis. She spoke about the issue at Labour's annual conference in 2016.

She supported Owen Smith against Jeremy Corbyn in the 2016 leadership election.

After a vote of MPs on 19 October 2016, Cooper was elected chair of the Home Affairs Select Committee, gaining more votes than fellow candidates, Caroline Flint, Chuka Umunna and Paul Flynn. As chair, Cooper launched a national inquiry into public views on immigration and, after an emergency inquiry into the Dubs scheme for child refugees, criticised the government's decision to end the programme in February 2017.

Cooper was critical of the May government's infrastructure plans' focus on big cities, and was formerly the chair of Labour Towns, a group of Labour MPs, councillors and mayors of towns seeking to promote investment in them – publishing a town manifesto in 2019.

She is a member of Labour Friends of Israel.

Brexit

During the Brexit process, Cooper consistently fought against a no-deal Brexit, tabling one of the main amendments in January 2019; others to table amendments were Caroline Spelman, Graham Brady, Rachel Reeves, Dominic Grieve and Ian Blackford.

In April, Cooper tabled a private members' bill, again with the intended effect of preventing a "no-deal" Brexit. The Bill was voted to be discussed as an important bill using processes often used for issues of national security. MPs voted 312 to 311 in favour of allowing her bill to be fast-tracked, and it was made law on 8 April 2019.

Starmer Shadow Cabinet: 2021–present

Cooper was reappointed as Shadow Home Secretary on 29 November 2021 by Keir Starmer, replacing Nick Thomas-Symonds in a shadow cabinet reshuffle.

Cooper is concerned over Home Secretary, Suella Braverman breaching the ministerial code through sending secure information with her private email.  Cooper wants possible security implications investigated. Cooper wrote to Cabinet Secretary, Simon Case "I am urging you and the Home Office to now urgently undertake such an investigation [into possible security breaches] as the public has a right to know that there are proper secure information procedures in place to cover the person who has been given charge of our national security." Cooper also said Sunak and Braverman cannot continue avoiding these issues and it raised doubts about the Prime Minister's judgement. She said that people need to be able to trust the Home Secretary with highly sensitive information and national security.

Cooper said Rishi Sunak made Gavin Williamson a cabinet minister though Sunak had been warned Williamson was being investigated over allegations he bullied Wendy Morton.  Cooper said the cases of Braverman and Williamson look like “grubby political deals that aren’t in the national interest.”   Cooper also said “[Sunak] has also appointed [Williamson] to the Cabinet Office, which supports the national security council, even though Gavin Williamson was previously sacked by Theresa May for leaking from the national security council.”  Cooper maintains under the Conservatives there is a lack of ethics and of proper standrds.

Personal life
Cooper married Ed Balls on 10 January 1998 in Eastbourne. Her husband was Economic Secretary to the Treasury in the Tony Blair government and Secretary of State for Children, Schools and Families under Gordon Brown, then in opposition was Shadow Chancellor of the Exchequer and a candidate in the 2010 Labour Party leadership election. The couple have two daughters and one son.

Cooper has published two books, entitled She Speaks: The power of Women's voices and She Speaks: Women's Speeches That Changed the World, from Pankhurst to Greta, released in November 2019 and October 2020 respectively.

References

External links

Yvette for Labour official site
Yvette Cooper  official site

|-

|-

|-

|-

|-

|-

|-

|-

1969 births
Living people
Alumni of Balliol College, Oxford
Alumni of the London School of Economics
British economists
British feminists
Ed Balls
English people of Scottish descent
Female members of the Cabinet of the United Kingdom
Female members of the Parliament of the United Kingdom for English constituencies
Labour Party (UK) MPs for English constituencies
Harvard University alumni
Kennedy Scholarships
Scottish LGBT rights activists
Labour Friends of Israel
Members of the Privy Council of the United Kingdom
People from Inverness
Scottish Labour politicians
Spouses of British politicians
UK MPs 1997–2001
UK MPs 2001–2005
UK MPs 2005–2010
UK MPs 2010–2015
UK MPs 2015–2017
UK MPs 2017–2019
UK MPs 2019–present
British women economists
Secretaries of State for Work and Pensions
20th-century British women politicians
21st-century British women politicians
Ministers of State for Housing (UK)
People with chronic fatigue syndrome
Chief Secretaries to the Treasury
The Independent people